This is a list of law enforcement agencies in the state of Ohio.

According to the US Bureau of Justice Statistics' 2008 Census of State and Local Law Enforcement Agencies, the state had 831 law enforcement agencies employing 25,992 sworn police officers, about 225 for each 100,000 residents.

State agencies
 Ohio Board of Pharmacy Agents
 Ohio Bureau of Criminal Investigation
 Ohio Bureau of Workers' Compensation Special Investigations Department
 Ohio Casino Control Commission Enforcement Division
 Ohio Department of Mental Health and Addiction Services Police
 Ohio Department of Natural Resources (Division of Parks and Watercraft and Division of Wildlife)
 Ohio Department of Public Safety
 Ohio Department of Rehabilitation and Correction
 Ohio Department of Youth Services
 Ohio Department of Taxation, Criminal Investigations
 Office of the Ohio Inspector General
 Ohio Office of the Attorney General Investigation Unit
 Ohio State Fire Marshal
 Ohio State Highway Patrol
 A component of the Highway Patrol is Ohio Investigative Unit, responsible for enforcement of state alcohol, tobacco and food stamp fraud laws.
 Ohio Veterans Home Police Department
 Public Utilities Commission of Ohio Enforcement

County agencies 
Ohio has 88 counties, each with its own elected county sheriff.

 Adams County Sheriff's Office
 Allen County Sheriff's Office
 Ashland County Sheriff's Office
 Ashtabula County Sheriff's Office
 Athens County Sheriff's Office 
 Auglaize County Sheriff's Office 
 Belmont County Sheriff's Office 
 Brown County Sheriff's Office 
 Butler County Sheriff's Office 
 Carroll County Sheriff's Office
 Champaign County Sheriff's Office
 Clark County Sheriff's Office
 Clermont County Sheriff's Office 
 Clinton County Sheriff's Office
 Columbiana County Sheriff's Office
 Coshocton County Sheriff's Office
 Crawford County Sheriff's Office 
 Cuyahoga County Sheriff's Office  
 Darke County Sheriff's Office 
 Defiance County Sheriffs Office
 Delaware County Sheriff's Office
 Erie County Sheriff's Office
 Fairfield County Sheriff's Office
 Fayette County Sheriff's Office
 Franklin County Sheriff's Office
 Fulton County Sheriff's Office
 Gallia County Sheriff's Office
 Geauga County Sheriff's Office
 Greene County Sheriff's Office
 Guernsey County Sheriff's Office
 Hamilton County Sheriff's Office 
 Hancock County Sheriff's Office
 Hardin County Sheriff's Office
 Harrison County Sheriff's Office
 Henry County Sheriff's Office 
 Highland County Sheriff's Office 
 Hocking County Sheriff's Office 
 Holmes County Sheriff's Office 
 Huron County Sheriff's Office 
 Jackson County Sheriff's Office 
 Jefferson County Sheriff's Office 
 Knox County Sheriff's Office 
 Lake County Sheriff's Office
 Lawrence County Sheriff's Office 
 Licking County Sheriff's Office
 Logan County Sheriff's Office 
 Lorain County Sheriff's Office 
 Lucas County Sheriff's Office
 Madison County Sheriff's Office 
 Mahoning County Sheriff's Office 
 Marion County Sheriff's Office
 Medina County Sheriff's Office 
 Meigs County Sheriff's Office
 Mercer County Sheriff's Office 
 Miami County Sheriff's Office 
 Monroe County Sheriff's Office
 Montgomery County Sheriff's Office
 Morgan County Sheriff's Office
 Morrow County Sheriff's Office 
 Muskingum County Sheriff's Office 
 Noble County Sheriff's Office 
 Ottawa County Sheriff's Office 
 Paulding County Sheriff's Office
 Perry County Sheriff's Office
 Pickaway County Sheriff's Office 
 Pike County Sheriff's Office
 Portage County Sheriff's Office
 Preble County Sheriff's Office 
 Putnam County Sheriff's Office 
 Richland County Sheriff's Office
 Ross County Sheriff's Office
 Sandusky County Sheriff's Office
 Scioto County Sheriff's Office
 Seneca County Sheriff's Office 
 Shelby County Sheriff's Office 
 Stark County Sheriff's Office 
 Summit County Sheriff's Office
 Trumbull County Sheriff's Office 
 Tuscarawas County Sheriff's Office
 Union County Sheriff's Office
 Van Wert County Sheriff's Office
 Vinton County Sheriff's Office
 Warren County Sheriff's Office
 Washington County Sheriff's Office 
 Wayne County Sheriff's Office
 Williams County Sheriff's Office 
 Wood County Sheriff's Office 
 Wyandot County Sheriff's Office

Municipal agencies 

Aberdeen Police Department 
Ada Police Department 
Addyston Police Department
Adena Police Department 
 Akron Police Department 
Albany Police Department
 Alexandria Police Department
 Alliance Police Department
Amberley Village Police Department
Amelia Police Department
Amesville Police Department
 Amherst Police Department 
Amsterdam Police Department
Andover Police Department
Anna Police Department
Ansonia Police Department
Antwerp Police Department
Apple Creek Police Department
Arcanum Police Department
Archbold Police Department
 Ashland Police Department
Ashley Police Department
 Ashtabula Police Department
Ashville Police Department
Athalia Police Department
 Athens Police Department
 Aurora Police Department
 Avon Police Department
 Avon Lake Police Department
Bairdstown Police Department
 Baltimore Police Department
 Barberton Police Department
Barnesville Police Department
Batavia Police Department
Bay View Police Department
 Bay Village Police Department
Beach City Police Department
 Beachwood Police Department
 Beavercreek Police Department
 Bedford Police Department
 Bedford Heights Police Department
Bellaire Police Department
 Bellbook Police Department
Bellefontaine Police Department
Bellevue Police Department
 Bellville Police Department
Belmont Police Department
Belmore Police Department
Belpre Police Department
Bentleyville Police Department
 Berea Police Department
Berkey Police Department
Bergholz Police Department
Berlin Heights Police Department
Bethel Police Department
Bethesda Police Department
Bettsville Police Department
Beverly Police Department
Bexley Police Department
Blanchester Police Department
Bloomville Police Department
 Blue Ash Police Department
 Bluffton Police Department
Bolivar Police Department
 Boston Heights Police Department
Botkins Police Department
 Bowling Green Police Department
Bradner Police Department
Bratenahl Police Department
Brecksville Police Department
Brewster Police Department
Brice Police Department
Bridgeport Police Department
Broadview Heights Police Department
 Brook Park Police Department
 Brooklyn Police Department
 Brooklyn Heights Police Department
 Brookville Police Department
 Brunswick Police Department
Bryan Police Department
 Buckeye Lake Police Department
 Bucyrus Police Department
Burton Police Department
 Butler Police Department
Byesville Police Department
Cadiz Police Department
Cairo Police Department
 Cambridge Police Department
Camden Police Department
Campbell Police Department
Canal Fulton Police Department
 Canfield Police Department
 Canton Police Department
Cardington Police Department
 Carey Police Department
 Carlisle Police Department
Carrollton Police Department
Castalia Police Department
Cedarville Police Department
 Celina Police Department
 Centerville Police Department
 Chagrin Falls Police Department
 Chardon Police Department
Chauncey Police Department
Chesapeake Police Department
Cheviot Police Department
 Chillicothe Police Department
 Cincinnati Police Department
 Circleville Police Department
 Cleveland Division of Police
 Cleveland Heights Police Department
 Clyde Police Department
Coal Grove Police Department
Coalton Police Department
Coitsville Police Department
 Coldwater Police Department
 Columbiana Police Department
 Columbus Division of Police
Columbus Grove Police Department
Commercial Point Police Department
Conneaut Police Department
Continental Police Department
Convoy Police Department
Coolville Police Department
Corning Police Department
 Cortland Police Department
Covington Police Department
Craig Beach Police Department
Crestline Police Department
Creston Police Department
Cridersville Police Department
Crooksville Police Department
 Cuyahoga Falls Police Department
Cuyahoga Heights Police Department
 Dalton Police Department
Danville Police Department
 Dayton Police Department
 Deer Park Police Department
 Defiance Police Department
De Graff Police Department
 Delaware Police Department
 Delphos Police Department
Delta Police Department
Dennison Police Department
Deshler Police Department
Dillonvale Police Department
 Dover Police Department
 Doylestown Police Department
Dresden Police Department
 Dublin Police Department
 East Canton Police Department
 East Cleveland Police Department
 East Liverpool Police Department
East Palestine Police Department
 Eastlake Police Department
 Eaton Police Department
Edgerton Police Department
Edon Police Department
 Elmore Police Department
 Elmwood Place Police Department
 Elyria Police Department
 Empire Police Department
 Englewood Police Department
 Euclid Police Department
Evendale Police Department
 Fairborn Police Department
Fairfax Police Department
Fairfield Police Department
 Fairlawn Police Department
Fairport Harbor Police Department
 Fairview Park Police Department
Fayette Police Department
Fayetteville Police Department
Felicity Police Department
 Findlay Police Department
 Flushing Police Department
Forest Police Department
Forest Park Police Department
 Fort Loramie Police Department
Fort Recovery Police Department
 Fostoria Division of Police
Fowler Police Department
 Franklin Division of Police
Frazeysburg Police Department
 Fremont Police Department
 Gahanna Division of Police
 Galion Police Department
 Gallipolis Police Department
 Garfield Heights Police Department
Garrettsville Police Department
 Gates Mills Police Department
Genesis Police Department
 Geneva Police Department
Geneva-on-the-Lake Police Department
Genoa Police Department
Georgetown Police Department
Germantown Police Department
Gibonsburg Police Department
Gilboa Police Department
Girard Police Department
Glandorf Police Department
Glendale Police Department
Glenmont Police Department
Glenwillow Police Department
Glouster Police Department
 Gnadenhutten Police Department
Golf Manor Police Department
Goshen Police Department
Goshen Police District Grafton Police Department
 Grand River Police Department
 Grandview Heights Division of Police
 Granville Police Department
Gratis Police Department
Green Springs Police Department
 Greenfield Police Department
Greenhills Police Department
 Greenville Police Department
Greenwich Police Department
 Grove City Division of Police
 Groveport Police Department
 Grover Hill Police Department
 Hamilton Police Department
Hanoverton Police Department
Harbor View Police Department
Harrisburg Police Department
 Harrison Police Department
 Hartford Police Department
Hartville Police Department
Harveysburg Police Department
Haskins Police Department
 Heath Police Department
Hebron Police Department
Hicksville Police Department
Higginsport Police Department
 Highland Heights Police Department
 Highland Hills Police Department
 Hilliard Division of Police
Hills and Dales Police Department
 Hillsboro Police Department
Hinckley Police Department
 Hiram Police Department
Holland Police Department
Howland Police Department
 Hubbard Police Department
Huber Heights Police Department
 Hudson Police Department
 Hunting Valley Police Department
Huron Police Department
Independence Police Department
 Indian Hill Rangers
 Ironton Police Department
 Jackson Police Department
Jackson Center Police Department
Jamestown Police Department
 Jefferson Police Department
Johnstown Police Department
Junction City Police Department
Kalida Police Department
 Kellys Island Police Department
 Kent Police Department
Kenton Police Department
 Kettering Police Department
Kipton Police Department
 Kirkersville Police Department
 Kirtland Police Department
Kirtland Hills Police Department
 LaGrange Police Department
Lafayette Police Department
Lake Waynoka Police Department
Lakemore Police Department
 Lakewood Police Department
 Lancaster Police Department
Laura Police Department
 Lebanon Division of Police
Leesburg Police Department
Leetonia Police Department
Leipsic Police Department
Lewisburg Police Department
 Lexington Police Department
 Lima Police Department
 Linndale Police Department
Lisbon Police Department
Lockland Police Department
Lodi Police Department
 Logan Police Department
 London Division of Police
 Lorain Police Department
 Lordstown Police Department
 Loudonville Police Department
 Louisville Police Department
 Loveland Police Department
Lowellville Police Department
Lynchburg Police Department
 Lyndhurst Police Department
Macedonia Police Department
Macksburg Police Department
 Madeira Police Department
Madison Police Department
Magnolia Police Department
 Maineville Police Department
Malvern Police Department
 Mansfield Division of Police 
 Mantua Police Department
Maple Heights Police Department
 Marblehead Police Department
Mariemont Police Department
 Marietta Police Department
 Marion Police Department
Marshallville Police Department
Martins Ferry Police Department
 Marysville Division of Police
 Mason Police Department
 Massillon Police Department
Maumee Police Department
Mayfield Police Department
 Mayfield Heights Police Department
McArthur Police Department
 McComb Police Department
McConnelsville Police Department
 McDonald Police Department
Mechanicsburg Police Department
 Medina Police Department
Melrose Police Department
 Mentor Police Department
 Mentor-on-the-Lake Police Department
 Miamisburg Police Department
Middleburg Heights Police Department
 Middlefield Police Department
Middleport Police Department
 Middletown Division of Police
Midvale Police Department
Mifflin Police Department
 Milan Police Department
 Milford Police Department
Millersburg Police Department
 Minerva Police Department
Minerva Park Police Department
Mingo Junction Police Department
Minster Police Department
Mogadore Police Department
Monroe Police Department
 Monroeville Police Department
Montgomery Police Department
 Montpelier Police Department
 Moraine Police Department
Moreland Hills Police Department
Morrow Police Department
 Moundsville Police Department
Mount Eaton Police Department
 Mount Gilead Police Department
 Mount Healthy Police Department
Mount Orab Police Department
Mount Pleasant Police Department
Mount Sterling Police Department
Mount Vernon Police Department
 Munroe Falls Police Department
Murray City Police Department
 Napoleon Police Department
Nashville Police Department
Navarre Police Department
 Nelsonville Police Department
 New Albany Police Department
New Alexandria Police Department
New Boston Police Department
New Bremen Police Department
New Concord Police Department
 New Franklin Police Department
New Holland Police Department
New Knoxville Police Department
New Lebanon Police Department
New Lexington Police Department
 New London Police Department
New Madison Police Department
New Matamoras Police Department
New Miami Police Department
New Middletown Police Department
New Paris Police Department
 New Philadelphia Police Department
 New Richmond Police Department
 New Straitsville Police Department
New Vienna Police Department
New Washington Police Department
New Waterford Police Department
 Newark Division of Police
 Newburgh Heights Police Department
Newbury Police Department
Newcomerstown Police Department
Newtonsville Police Department
Newtown Police Department
 Niles Police Department
North Baltimore Police Department
 North Canton Police Department
North College Hill Police Department
North Hampton Police Department
North Kingsville Police Department
North Lewisburg Police Department
 North Olmsted Police Department
North Perry Police Department
 North Randall Police Department
 North Ridgeville Police Department
 North Royalton Police Department
Northfield Police Department
Northwood Police Department
Norton Police Department
 Norwalk Police Department
 Norwood Police Department
Oak Harbor Police Department
Oak Hill Police Department
 Oakwood Police Department
 Oberlin Police Department
 Obetz Police Department
Olmsted Falls Police Department
 Ontario Police Department
Orange Police Department
Oregon Police Department
Orrville Police Department
Orwell Police Department
Ostrander Police Department
 Ottawa Police Department
 Ottawa Hills Police Department
Ottoville Police Department
Owensville Police Department
 Oxford Police Department
Painesville Police Department
Pandora Police Department
 Parma Police Department
 Parma Heights Police Department
 Pataskala Division of Police
Paulding Police Department
Payne Police Department
Peebles Police Department
Pemberville Police Department
 Peninsula Police Department
Pepper Pike Police Department
 Perry Police Department
Perrysburg Police Department
Phillipsburg Police Department
 Pickerington Department of Police & Safety
Piketon Police Department
 Pioneer Police Department
Piqua Police Department
Plain City Police Department
Pleasant Hill Police Department
 Plymouth Police Department
 Poland Police Department
Pomeroy Police Department
 Port Clinton Police Department
 Port Jefferson Police Department
Port Washington Police Department
 Port William Police Department
 Portsmouth Police Department
 Powell Police Department
 Powhatan Point Police Department
Proctorville Police Department
 Put-in-Bay Police Department
Racine Police Department
 Ravenna Police Department
Rayland Police Department
Reading Police Department
 Reminderville Police Department
Republic Police Department
 Reynoldsburg Division of Police
 Richfield Police Department
 Richmond Heights Police Department
Richwood Police Department
Rio Grande Police Department
Risingsun Police Department
 Rittman Police Department
 Riverside Police Department
Roaming Shores Police Department
Rockford Police Department
Rocky Ridge Police Department
 Rocky River Police Department
Roseville Police Department
Rossford Police Department
Russell Police Department
Russells Point Police Department
Russellville Police Department
Rutland Police Department
Sabina Police Department
 Salem Police Department
Salineville Police Department
 Sandusky Police Department
Sardinia Police Department
Scio Police Department
Scott Police Department
Seaman Police Department
 Sebring Police Department
 Seven Hills Police Department
Seven Mile Police Department
Seville Police Department
Shadyside Police Department
 Shaker Heights Police Department
 Sharonville Police Department
Shawnee Police Department
 Shawnee Hills Police Department
Sheffield Police Department
 Sheffield Lake Police Department
 Shelby Police Department
Shreve Police Department
Sidney Police Department
 Silver Lake Police Department
Smithville Police Department
 Solon Police Department
Somerset Police Department
 South Amherst Police Department
 South Bloomfield Police Department
South Charleston Police Department
 South Euclid Police Department
South Point Police Department
 South Russell Police Department
South Solon Police Department
South Vienna Police Department
South Zanesville Police Department
Spencer Police Department
Spencerville Police Department
 Springboro Police Department
 Springdale Police Department
 Springfield Police Department
St. Bernard Police Department
St. Clairsville Police Department
St. Henry Police Department
St. Louisville Police Department
St. Marys Police Department
 St. Paris Police Department
 Steubenville Police Department
Stow Police Department
Strasburg Police Department
 Streetsboro Police Department
 Strongsville Police Department
 Struthers Police Department
 Stryker Police Department
Sugar Grove Police Department
Sugarcreek Police Department
Summitville Police Department
Sunbury Police Department
Swanton Police Department
Sylvania Police Department
Syracuse Police Department
 Tallmadge Police Department
Terrace Park Police Department
Thornville Police Department
 Tiffin Police Department
Tiltonsville Police Department
 Timberlake Police Department
 Tipp City Police Department
 Toledo Police Department
Toronto Police Department
Tremont City Police Department
 Trenton Police Department
 Trotwood Police Department
 Troy Police Department
Tuscarawas Police Department
 Twinsburg Police Department
Uhrichsville Police Department
Union Police Department
Union City Police Department
 Uniontown Police Department
University Heights Police Department
 Upper Arlington Police Division
 Upper Sandusky Police Department
Urbana Police Department
Valley View Police Department
Valleyview Police Department
 Van Wert Police Department
Vandalia Police Department
Vermilion Police Department
Verona Police Department
Versailles Police Department
 Wadsworth Police Department
Waite Hill Police Department
 Wakeman Police Department
 Walbridge Police Department
Walton Hills Police Department
 Wapakoneta Police Department
 Warren Police Department
Warrensville Heights Police Department
Washington Court House Police Department
Washingtonville Police Department
Waterville Police Department
 Wauseon Police Department
 Waverly Police Department
 Waynesburg Police Department
Waynesfield Police Department
Waynesville Police Department
Wellington Police Department
Wellston Police Department
Wellsville Police Department
West Alexandria Police Department
 West Carrollton Police Department
West Elkton Police Department
West Farmington Police Department
West Jefferson Police Department
West Lafayette Police Department
 West Liberty Police Department
West Milton Police Department
 West Salem Police Department
West Union Police Department
West Unity Police Department
 Westerville Division of Police
 Westlake Police Department
 Whitehall Police Department
Whitehouse Police Department
 Wickliffe Police Department
 Willard Police Department
Williamsburg Police Department
 Willoughby Police Department
 Willoughby Hills Police Department
 Willowick Police Department
Wilmington Police Department
Winchester Police Department
 Windham Police Department
Wintersville Police Department
Woodlawn Police Department
 Woodmere Police Department
 Woodsfield Police Department
Woodville Police Department
Wooster Police Department
 Worthington Police Department
Wyoming Police Department
 Xenia Police Division
 Yellow Springs Police Department
Yorkville Police Department
 Youngstown Police Department
 Zanesville Police Department

Township agencies 

American Township Police Department
 Austintown Township Police Department
 Bainbridge Township Police Department
 Bath Township Police Department
 Bazetta Township Police Department
 Beaver Township Police Department
 Boardman Township Police Department
 Brimfield Township Police Department
 Brookfield Township Police Department
 Brunswick Hills Township Police Department
 Butler Township Police Department
 Carroll Township Police Department
 Center Township Police Department
 Champion Township Police Department
 Chester Township Police Department
 Clay Township Police Department
 Clearcreek Township Police Department
 Clinton Township Police Department
 Colerain Township Police Department
 Copley Township Police Department
 Cross Creek Township Police Department
 Delhi Township Police Department
Fairfield Township Police Department
 Franklin Township Police Department
Genoa Township Police Department
 German Township Police Department
 Goshen Township Police Department
 Green Township Police Department
Hamilton Township Police Department
Hartford Township Police Department
 Hubbard Township Police Department
 Jackson Township Police Department
Jackson Township Police Department
Jackson Township Police Department
Johnston Township Police Department
Lake Township Police Department
 Lawrence Township Police Department
 Liberty Township Police Department
Liverpool Township Police Department
 Madison Township Police Department
Marlboro Township Police Department
 Medina Township Police Department
 Miami Township Police Department
 Milton Township Police Department
 Montville Township Police Department
 Olmsted Township Police Department
 Oxford Township Police Department
 Perkins Township Police Department
 Perry Township Police Department
 Poland Township Police Department
Ross Township Police Department
 Russell Township Police Department
 Sagamore Hills Township Police Department
Salem Township Police Department
 Sharon Township Police Department
Shawnee Township Police Department
 Smith Township Police Department
Smithfield Township Police Department
 Springfield Township Police Department
St. Clair Township Police Department
Sugarcreek Township Police Department
 Union Township Police Department
Union Township Police Department (Butler County)
Union Township Police Department (Clermont County)
 Warren Township Police Department
Waterville Township Police Department
 Weathersfield Township Police Department
Wells Township Police Department
 West Chester Township Police Department

College and university agencies 

 Bowling Green State University Police - Bowling Green State University
 Capital University Police - Capital University
 Case Western Reserve University Police - Case Western Reserve University
 Central State University Police - Central State University
 Cincinnati State Technical and Community College Police 
 Cleveland State University Police - Cleveland State University
 Columbus State Community College Police - Columbus State Community College
 Cuyahoga Community College Police - Cuyahoga Community College
 Hocking College Police- Hocking College
 John Carroll University Police Department - John Carroll University
 Kent State University Police - Kent State University
 Lakeland Community College Police Department - Lakeland Community College
 Marietta College Police Department - Marietta College
 Miami University Police - Miami University
 Mount St. Joseph University Police Department - Mount St. Joseph University
 Muskingum College Police - Muskingum College
 Notre Dame College Police  - Notre Dame College
 Ohio University Police Department  - Ohio University
 The Ohio State University Police  - Ohio State University
 Otterbein University Police  - Otterbein University
 Owens Community College Department of Public Safety  - Owens Community College
 Shawnee State University Department of Public Safety - Shawnee State University
 Sinclair Community College Police - Sinclair Community College
 University of Cincinnati Police - University of Cincinnati
 University of Akron Police - University of Akron
 University of Dayton Police - University of Dayton
 University of Findlay Police - University of Findlay
 University of Toledo Police - University of Toledo
 Wittenberg University Police - Wittenberg University
 Wright State University Police  - Wright State University
 Xavier University Police - Xavier University
 Youngstown State University Police  - Youngstown State University

Other agencies
 Akron Children's Hospital Police Department - Department of Public Safety.
Atrium Medical Center Police
Bureau of Alcohol, Tobacco, Firearms, and Explosives Columbus Field Division 
 Butler County Metroparks Division of Law Enforcement - MetroParks of Butler County in Butler County, Ohio
 Cedar Point Park Police - Cedar Point in Sandusky
 Cleveland Clinic Police - Cleveland Clinic
 Columbus Regional Airport Authority Police - Columbus Regional Airport Authority
CSX Police Department
 Cuyahoga Metropolitan Housing Authority (CMHA) Police - Cuyahoga Metropolitan Housing Authority
 Cleveland Metropolitan School District Police - Cleveland Metropolitan School District
 Dayton Children's Public Safety Police Department- Dayton
Federal Bureau of Investigation Cincinnati Field Office
Federal Bureau of Investigation Cleveland Field Office
 Five Rivers MetroParks Police - Dayton Ranger Division
 Geauga County Park District Rangers - Geauga County Ranger Division
 Goshen Police District - Goshen Township, Green Township,  Villages of Beloit and Sebring
 Grand Lake Drug Task Force
 Greater Cleveland Regional Transit Authority (RTA) Transit Police - Cleveland, Ohio
 Hamilton County Park Rangers - Cincinnati, Ohio
 Holden Arboretum Police Department
 Humility of Mary Health Partners (HMHP) Police - Youngstown, Ohio
 Lake Metroparks Ranger Department - Lake County, Ohio.
IX Center Security Police
 Kings Island Park Police - Kings Island in Mason
 Licking Memorial Hospital Police - Newark
 MetroHealth System Police - Department of Public Safety (MHPD) -  - Cleveland, Ohio - Cuyahoga County
 Mercy Public Safety Department - Mercy Health Partners in Toledo
Mill Creek MetroParks Police Department - Serves Mill Creek MetroParks facilities in Mahoning County, Ohio.
Norfolk Southern Railroad Police
 Southeast Area Law Enforcement ‘’SEALE’’ 
 Southwest Enforcement Bureau ‘’SEB’’
Southwest Ohio Developmental Center Police Department
 Suburban Anticrime Network ‘’SPAN’’ 
 Summit Metro 
ProMedica Police Department
UC Health Lindner Center of Hope Police
UC Health Public Safety Police
United States Department of Veterans Affairs Police Department
United States Federal Protective Service
 United States Marshals Service for the Northern District of Ohio
 United States Marshals Service for the Southern District of Ohio
United States Postal Inspection Service
United States Secret Service Cincinnati Field Office
United States Secret Service Cleveland Field Office
 University Circle Police Department – University Circle, Cleveland. UCPD patrols the area surrounding Case Western Reserve University, Cleveland Institute of Art, and Cleveland Institute of Music but is owned by University Circle, Inc. and is separate from the CWRU Police listed above.
 Summa Health System Police(Ohio)|Summit County Ohio
 University Hospitals of Cleveland Police Department 
 University Hospitals Bedford Medical Center Police Department 
 Valley Enforcement Group ‘’VEG’’ 
 Westshore Enforcement Bureau ‘’WEB’’ 
 Cuyahoga County Agriculture Society/Fairgrounds Police Department
 METRICH Enforcement Unit

Disbanded/defunct
Arlington Heights Police Department
Attica Police Department
Alger Police Department
Baltimore and Ohio Southwestern Railroad Police
Belle Center Police Department 
Brady Lake Police Department
Bremen Police Department
Boston Mills Police Department
Buchtel Police Department
Buckland Police Department
 Caldwell Police Department 
Cairo Police Department
Carthage Police Department
Carthage National Distillers Police
Castalia Police Department
Chesapeake and Ohio Railroad Police
Cincinnati General Hospital Police
Cincinnati Merchants Police
Cincinnati Park Board Police
Cincinnati Private Police
Cincinnati Special Police
Cincinnati Union Terminal Police
Cincinnati Water Works Police
Cleveland Cincinnati Chicago and St. Louis Railroad Police
Cleveland Metroparks Ranger Department (Changed title back to "Police")- Cleveland Metroparks
Cleves Police Department
Cloverdale Police Department
Colerain Springfield Police
College Corner Police Department
Conrail Railroad Police 
 Edison Police Department
Elida Police Department
Fairview Village Police Department 
Fernald Security Police Department 
Fletcher Police Department
Fort Shawnee Police Department
Franklin Township [Merged into New Franklin]
Hamler Town Marshal's Office
Hartwell Police Department 
Heights Merchants Police Department
Holgate Police Department
Hudson Township Police Department
Hyde Park Marshal's Office 
Knox Township Police Department
Lakeview Police Department 
LayFayette Police Department
Lemon Township Police Department 
Lincoln Heights Police Department 
Lockington Police Department
Lordstown Marshal's Office
Madisonville Police Department 
Malinta Police Department
Malvern Police Department
 Manchester Police Department 
McClure Police Department
Moscow Police Department 
New Madison Police Department
Newton Falls Police Department
New Orleans and Texas Pacific Railroad Police 
 New Riegel Police Department 
 New Rome Police Department 
Newtonsville Police Department 
North Bend Police Department 
Northern Hills Rangers 
Oakley Police Department 
Ohio Board of State Charities Agents 
Ohio Department of Industrial Relations Inspectors
Ohio Department of Liquor Control Enforcement Division
Ohio Department of Mental Health Lewis Center Police
Ohio Department of Mental Health Longview Police
Ohio Department of Mental Health Rollman Psychiatric Institute Police
Ohio State Fair Police
Ohio State Protective Association
Pennsylvania Railroad Police Department
Portage Police Department
Quincy Police Department 
Randolph Fair Police Department
Randolph Township Police Department
Ravenna Township Police Department
Richfield Township
Rural Ohio Police
Rushylvania Police Department 
Silverton Police Department
South Lebanon Police Department
Stokes Township Police Department 
Sugar Bush Knolls Police Department
 Sycamore Village Police Department
Symmes Township Police Department
Tax Commission of Ohio Enforcement
Twinsburg Township Police Department
Valley Hi Police Department 
West Mansfield Police Department 
Zaleski Police Department

References

External links
 City Data - Ohio

Law enforcement agencies of Ohio
Ohio
Law enforcement agencies